Lincroft Academy is a co-educational secondary school located in Oakley in the English county of Bedfordshire.

It was established as a secondary modern school in the early 1960s on land that was part of Oakley Grange. In the early 1970s it became a middle school educating pupils aged 9 to 13. In February 2011 the school converted to academy status and adopted its present name. In 2017 it became a secondary school educating pupils aged 11 to 16.

Today the school forms part of the Cambridge Meridian Academies Trust which includes 25 schools.

Notable former pupils
Oliver Gavin, racing driver
Paula Radcliffe, marathon runner and olympian
Nick Tandy, racing driver

References

External links

Academies in the Borough of Bedford
Secondary schools in the Borough of Bedford